Pan Européenne Air Service is a French charter airline based in Chambéry, France. It was established and started operations in 1977, it is the oldest French air-taxi company still in operation. Its main bases are Chambéry Airport and Lyon-Bron Airport, Lyon. Specialized in business charter flights and VIP air taxi flights, Pan-Européenne Air Service operates a fleet of 5 aircraft. The company also runs an Embraer certified maintenance shop, located on Chambéry-Savoie Airport.

Fleet 
The Pan-Européenne Air Service fleet currently includes the following aircraft :

Activities 
Pan-Européenne Air Service operates VIP business flights under public transportation rules from and towards Europe and North-Africa thanks to its Embraer Phenom fleet. 

Based on the Chambéry-Savoie Airport, it serves the Alps Ski resorts, such as Courchevel, Megève and Méribel.

The ERJ fleet operates flights for sport teams, shuttle for business companies, or flights for special events. It also operates for the account of Air France-KLM, on regional and European lines.

The Company is flying under the code EUP (callsign : SAVOY) for the ERJ fleet and PEA (callsign : PEA) for the Phenom fleet.

See also
List of airlines of France
List of charter airlines

External links 
Pan Européenne Air Service
Pan Européenne Air Service at aircharterguide.com

References 

Airlines of France
Airlines established in 1977